National Cabinet is the Australian intergovernmental decision-making forum composed of the prime minister and state and territory premiers and chief ministers. Originally established on 13 March 2020 in response to the COVID-19 pandemic, National Cabinet replaced the now-defunct Council of Australian Governments (COAG) as the primary intergovernmental forum on 29 May 2020, citing excessive bureaucracy and infrequent meetings. National Cabinet is composed of the main forum (prime minister, premiers, and chief ministers), and specialised committees focusing on: rural and regional Australia, skills, infrastructure, health, transport, population and migration, and energy.

History and description
The formation of the National Cabinet was announced by Prime Minister Scott Morrison on 13 March 2020, following a meeting of the Council of Australian Governments (COAG). It was created via the "National Partnership on COVID-19 Response" agreement to "coordinate and deliver a consistent national response to COVID-19" during the global COVID-19 pandemic.

The New Zealand Prime Minister, Jacinda Ardern, joined a National Cabinet meeting in May 2020 to discuss the economic benefits of trans-Tasman travel between the two nations.

It has been described as akin to Australia's War Cabinet during the Second World War. At the heights of the pandemic (prior to the widespread rollout of COVID-19  vaccines), meetings of National Cabinet were held using secure video conferencing. National Cabinet has been criticised for its secrecy.

Role and responsibilities
The National Cabinet is responsible for endorsing and coordinating national actions in Australia in response to the coronavirus pandemic. It is advised and supported by the Australian Health Protection Principal Committee (AHPPC), an ongoing body composed of the Chief Medical Officer of the Commonwealth, Brendan Murphy, and the Chief Health Officers of each of the states and territories. The AHPPC uses the currently available modelling, research and data to inform the decisions made by the National Cabinet.

The prime minister said that the National Cabinet has "the status of a cabinet meeting" at a federal level, meaning it has the same confidentiality and Freedom of Information protections as the federal cabinet, under the Freedom of Information Act 1982. The legal authority for much of this structure is based on practice and convention, contained in the official Cabinet Handbook; strictly speaking, based on the Westminster system, cabinet decisions do not of themselves have legal authority. This comes from the Federal Executive Council, which gives legal force to decisions made by cabinet. The "National Partnership on Covid-19 Response" states in Part 6 (46) that the parties "do not intend any of the provisions of this Agreement to be legally enforceable".

Public policy specialist Jennifer Menzies describes the National Cabinet as "COAG by another name", which has taken on a leadership role during a time of national crisis. She writes "Though called a cabinet, the national cabinet is technically an intergovernmental forum. The conventions and rules of cabinet, such as cabinet solidarity and the secrecy provisions, do not apply to the national cabinet. Its power is that which the leaders of all Australian jurisdictions bring to negotiate on behalf of their people, and to implement the decisions reached." This model has been called executive federalism.

Current membership

Former membership

Meetings and press releases

 16 March 2020: Announcement of a "significant step-up" to the pandemic, upon the advice of the AHPPC, with additional measures in order to reduce community transmission. These included banning cruise ships from docking, enhanced screening of arrivals, and mandatory self-isolation for everyone arriving in Australia. National Cabinet also activated the second stage of the Australian Health Sector Emergency Response Plan for Novel Coronavirus, which "enables governments to undertake targeted action... and ensures that resources are properly allocated where needed and the risks to vulnerable people in the community are mitigated".
 25 March 2020: PM announces creation of the National COVID-19 Coordination Commission (NCCC), and clarifies role of various bodies: the National Cabinet "continues to lead the national response at a government level. The National Security Committee of Cabinet's COVID-19 Taskforce and the Expenditure Review Committee of Cabinet continue to take decisions that determine the Commonwealth's response to the global COVID-19 pandemic".
 29 March 2020: National Cabinet noted that the rate of increase of the spread of COVID-19 was slowing, but overall numbers were still increasing and welcomed the new coronavirus app and WhatsApp channel released by the Government. It announced new limits to indoor and outdoor gatherings to two persons only (with some exceptions); discussed further social distancing measures; gave further advice to senior citizens; and agreed to a moratorium on evictions for the coming six months for both commercial and residential tenancies suffering financial distress.
 4 May 2020: Jacinda Ardern, the Prime Minister of New Zealand, was invited to join the National Cabinet in a meeting on 5 May, to discuss strategies in dealing with the virus and the Australian COVIDSafe app.
 29 May 2020: PM announces that the National Cabinet will replace COAG on a permanent basis, meeting monthly once the pandemic is over.
 18 September 2020: National Cabinet met to discuss Australia's COVID-19 response, recent progress following the Victorian outbreak and easing restrictions (including international border measures).
 16 October 2020: National Cabinet meeting postponed to "technical problems" with Prime Minister Morrison's plane.
 23 October 2020: National Cabinet discussed and made announcements regarding progress following the Victorian outbreak, the budget, and made announcements on the newly-developed "Framework for National Reopening Australia by Christmas", improving quarantine systems, returning citizens, the Mental Health National Cabinet Reform Committee, Aged Care Emergency Response Centres, and the establishment of a Taskforce on Veterans’ Wellbeing.
 13 November 2020 (31st meeting): National Cabinet discussed Australia's COVID-19 response, COVID-19 vaccination policy, the Framework for National Reopening by Christmas, helping Australians prepare to go back to work in a COVID-safe environment, getting the economy moving again, a review of contact tracing and outbreak management systems, returning Australians, international students and other matters.
 22 January 2021: National Cabinet convened to discuss international return limits and COVID-19 vaccines. The forum decided to remain at a reduced rate, following the introduction of the more infectious UK strain into Australia, until 15 February. National Cabinet also agreed that the COVID-19 vaccine is not currently planned to be mandatory for aged care workers, but may become so later, noting concerns from the industry that it should be mandatory.
 4 June 2021: National Cabinet met to discuss Australia’s COVID-19 response and changes to the Australian COVID-19 Vaccine Strategy.

Succession of COAG

There had been suggestions for the National Cabinet to continue on a permanent basis after the pandemic is over, effectively replacing COAG. On 14 April 2020, Prime Minister Morrison was reported saying, "The processes we've established for the National Cabinet may prove to be a better way for our federal system to work in the future, but this will be a matter for another time", and Western Australian Premier Mark McGowan said no other state leaders had objected when he had brought up the idea of continuing the National Cabinet. He also told The Australian newspaper, "The National Cabinet process has removed the political boundaries that can hamper COAG".

Former Labor Premier of South Australia, Jay Weatherill called it a "fantastic innovation [that] should continue", adding that it had "achieved more in the last few months than many COAGs have achieved over many years".

On 29 May 2020, the Prime Minister announced that the National Cabinet would replace COAG (with COAG being abolished) and meetings after the pandemic would be held monthly, instead of the biannual meetings of COAG. According to Simon Benson of The Australian newspaper, an analogy used to describe the significance of this was "as if the United Nations had been turned into a government".

See also

References

Further reading
  (5 mins 50 secs)
 

Government of Australia
Council of Australian Governments
2020 in Australia
2020 establishments in Australia
COVID-19 pandemic in Australia